Meher Vij (born Vaishali Sahdev) is an Indian actress who appears in Hindi films and television. She is the recipient of a Filmfare Award. She played supporting roles in the drama film Bajrangi Bhaijaan (2015) and the musical drama Secret Superstar (2017), both of which rank among the highest grossing Indian films of all time; for the latter she won the Filmfare Award Best Supporting Actress. She has appeared in television shows including Kis Desh Mein Hai Meraa Dil and Ram Milaye Jodi.

Personal life
Vij has two brothers, actors Piyush Sahdev and Gireesh Sahdev. In 2009, she married Manav Vij in Mumbai, after which she changed her name from Vaishali Sahdev to Meher Vij.

Filmography

Films

Television

Awards and nominations

Filmfare Awards

Star Screen Awards

Zee Cine Awards

IIFA Awards

References

External links
 
 
 

Living people
People from Delhi
21st-century Indian actresses
Indian film actresses
Indian soap opera actresses
Actresses in Hindi cinema
Actresses in Punjabi cinema
Actresses in Hindi television
Actresses from Delhi
Filmfare Awards winners
Screen Awards winners
International Indian Film Academy Awards winners
Year of birth missing (living people)
Zee Cine Awards winners